Nur ad-Din al-Bitruji (also spelled Nur al-Din Ibn Ishaq al-Betrugi and Abu Ishâk ibn al-Bitrogi) (known in the West by the Latinized name of Alpetragius) (died c. 1204) was an Iberian-Arab astronomer and a Qadi in al-Andalus. Al-Biṭrūjī was the first astronomer to present a non-Ptolemaic astronomical system as an alternative to Ptolemy's models, with the planets borne by geocentric spheres. Another original aspect of his system was that he proposed a physical cause of celestial motions. His alternative system spread through most of Europe during the 13th century.

The crater Alpetragius on the Moon is named after him.

Life

Almost nothing about his life is known, except that his name probably derives from Los Pedroches (al-Biṭrawsh), a region near Cordoba. He was a disciple of Ibn Tufail (Abubacer) and was a contemporary of Averroes.

Planetary model 
Al-Bitruji proposed a theory on planetary motion in which he wished to avoid both epicycles and eccentrics, and to account for the phenomena peculiar to the wandering stars, by compounding rotations of homocentric spheres. This was a modification of the system of planetary motion proposed by his predecessors, Ibn Bajjah (Avempace) and Ibn Tufail (Abubacer). He was unsuccessful in replacing Ptolemy's planetary model, as the numerical predictions of the planetary positions in his configuration were less accurate than those of the Ptolemaic model, because of the difficulty of mapping Ptolemy's epicyclic model onto Aristotle's concentric spheres.

It was suggested based on the Latin translations that his system is an update and reformulation of that of Eudoxus of Cnidus combined with the motion of fixed stars developed by al-Zarqālī. However, it is not known whether the Andalusian cosmologists had access or knowledge of Eudoxus works.

One original aspects of al-Biṭrūjī's system is his proposal of a physical cause of celestial motions. He contradicts the Aristotelian idea that there is a specific kind of dynamics for each world, applying instead the same dynamics to the sublunar and the celestial worlds.

His alternative system spread through most of Europe during the 13th century, with debates and refutations of his ideas continued up to the 16th century. Copernicus cited his system in the De revolutionibus while discussing theories of the order of the inferior planets.

Works
Al-Bitruji wrote Kitāb al-Hayʾah (The book of theoretical astronomy/cosmology, Arabic, كتاب الهيئة), which presented criticism of Ptolomy's Almagest from a physical point of view. 
It was well known in Europe between the 13th and the 16th centuries, and was regarded as a valid alternative to Ptolemy's Almagest in scholastic circles.

This work was translated into Latin by Michael Scot in 1217 as De motibus celorum  (first printed in Vienna in 1531). A Hebrew translation by Moses ibn Tibbon was done in 1259.

There is also an anonymous treatise on tides (Escorial MS 1636, dated 1192) which contains material seemingly borrowed from al-Bitruji.

Notes

References
  (PDF version)

Further reading 
 Helaine Selin, Encyclopaedia of the history of science, technology, and medicine in non western cultures, p. 160

12th-century births
1204 deaths
12th-century Arabs
13th-century Arabs
Astronomers from al-Andalus
Scholars from al-Andalus
12th-century philosophers
Islamic philosophers
Year of birth unknown
12th-century astronomers
Philosophers from al-Andalus
12th-century writers from al-Andalus